Shannon Roers Jones is an American attorney and politician. She served in the North Dakota House of Representatives from the 46th district since December 1, 2016. She was the North Dakota House Republican Caucus Chairperson from 2019 to 2021.

Early life and education 
Roers Jones was born to Debby and Jim Roers in Fargo, North Dakota and lived near Horace for most of her early life. Her father is CEO of Roers Construction, a company he formed in 1976. She studied business in college, earning a Bachelor of Arts from the College of St. Benedict in 1999 and an MBA from University of St. Thomas in 2001. She then earned a Juris Doctor from University of North Dakota School of Law in 2011.

Career 
Roers Jones started her career working for multiple construction firms and in the real estate industry. After law school, she began working as a real estate Attorney as well as the main attorney in her father's business.

Electoral history 
Roers Jones first ran for office in 2016, when she ran for the house seat for district 46 as the Republican successor to retiring incumbent Kathy Hawken. She won with 28.64% of the vote.

Political positions

Work on Sunday 
In 2017, Shannon Roers Jones spearheaded the push to repeal the last remnants of North Dakota's Blue laws. The 2017 bill failed.  In 2019 she again sponsored the bill which would make it legal for stores to be open on Sundays before noon. In 2019, her bill passed both the House and the Senate and was signed onto law by Governor Doug Burgum, and went into effect on August 1, 2019.

Marijuana and criminal justice 
Roers Jones opposes legalization of recreational marijuana. However, in 2019, she sponsored a bill calling for the decriminalization of possession of small amounts of marijuana (less than one ounce or less than 6 ounce). Under this bill, people found with small amounts of marijuana would still pay a fine, but it would not show up in their criminal records. This bill would also have expunged the criminal records of various non-violent and non-sex offenders. The bill failed to pass the ND House.

Personal life 
Roers Jones lives in south Fargo with her three daughters Olivia, Kendall and Kate. Her father Jim was elected to the North Dakota State Senate in 2016, the year she was also elected to the ND House of Representative. They both represent the 46th District. In 2018, her cousin Kristin Roers was also elected to the ND State Senate. She represents the 27th district.

References 

21st-century American politicians
Living people
Republican Party members of the North Dakota House of Representatives
College of Saint Benedict and Saint John's University alumni
University of St. Thomas (Minnesota) alumni
University of North Dakota alumni
People from Cass County, North Dakota
Year of birth missing (living people)
21st-century American women politicians
Women state legislators in North Dakota